is the 31st single by Japanese entertainer Akina Nakamori. Written by Neko Oikawa and Masaki, the single was released on June 21, 1995, by MCA Victor. It was also the lead single from her 16th studio album La Alteración.

The single peaked at No. 15 on Oricon's weekly singles chart and sold over 100,200 copies.

Track listing 
All music is arranged by Yasunori Iwasaki.

Charts

References

External links 
 
 

1995 singles
1995 songs
Akina Nakamori songs
Japanese-language songs
Songs with lyrics by Neko Oikawa
Universal Music Japan singles
MCA Records singles